David Clarke (born 6 June 1950) is a Scottish former football player and manager. Clarke played for East Fife for his whole career, making over 500 league appearances. He holds the club record for most appearances, with 627 in all competitions. Clarke has also managed East Fife, in two different spells, and Falkirk.

References

External links 

1950 births
Living people
Footballers from Edinburgh
Scottish footballers
East Fife F.C. players
Scottish Football League players
Association football defenders
Scottish football managers
East Fife F.C. managers
Falkirk F.C. managers
Scottish Football League managers